Odintsovskaya is a rural locality (a village) in Shenkursky District, Arkhangelsk Oblast, Russia. The population was 218 as of 2010.

Geography 
Odintsovskaya is located on the Led River, 29 km north of Shenkursk (the district's administrative centre) by road. Fedkovskaya is the nearest rural locality.

References 

Rural localities in Shenkursky District